Denis Aleksandrovich Polyakov or Dzyanis Alyaksandravich Palyakow (born 17 April 1991) is a Belarusian professional footballer for Hapoel Haifa.

Club career
On 28 December 2017, he moved to Cyprus, signing with APOEL.

On 25 December 2018 he signed a long-term contract with Russian Premier League club FC Ural Yekaterinburg.

On 24 August 2020, he signed a 1.5-year contract with Kazakhstani club Kairat. On 19 January 2022, Kairat announced that Polyakov had left the club at the end of his contract.

International career 
Polyakov was part of the Belarus U21 that finished in 3rd place at the 2011 UEFA European Under-21 Football Championship. He was also a member of the Belarus Olympic side that participated in the 2012 Toulon Tournament and the 2012 Olympic tournament in London. Polyakov has represented the full Belarus national football team, appearing in 2014 World Cup qualifiers.

International goals
Scores and results list Belarus' goal tally first.

Honours
BATE Borisov
Belarusian Premier League champion: 2012, 2013, 2014, 2015, 2016, 2017, 2018
Belarusian Cup winner: 2014–15
Belarusian Super Cup winner: 2014, 2015, 2016, 2017

APOEL
Cypriot First Division champion: 2017–18

Astana
Kazakhstan Premier League champion: 2022

Belarus U21 
UEFA European Under-21 Championship bronze: 2011

References

Extermanl links
 

1991 births
Living people
Footballers from Minsk
Belarusian footballers
Association football defenders
Belarus international footballers
FC Shakhtyor Soligorsk players
FC BATE Borisov players
APOEL FC players
FC Ural Yekaterinburg players
FC Kairat players
Hapoel Haifa F.C. players
Belarusian Premier League players
Cypriot First Division players
Russian Premier League players
Kazakhstan Premier League players
Israeli Premier League players
Olympic footballers of Belarus
Footballers at the 2012 Summer Olympics
Belarusian expatriate footballers
Expatriate footballers in Cyprus
Expatriate footballers in Russia
Expatriate footballers in Kazakhstan
Expatriate footballers in Israel
Belarusian expatriate sportspeople in Cyprus
Belarusian expatriate sportspeople in Russia
Belarusian expatriate sportspeople in Kazakhstan
Belarusian expatriate sportspeople in Israel